Homeobox protein CDX-2 is a protein that in humans is encoded by the CDX2 gene. The CDX2 protein is a homeobox transcription factor expressed in the nuclei of intestinal epithelial cells, playing an essential role in the development and function of the digestive system. CDX2 part of the ParaHox gene cluster, a group of three highly conserved developmental genes present in most vertebrate species. Together with CDX1 and CDX4, CDX2 is one of three caudal-related genes in the human genome.

Function 
In common with the two other Cdx genes, CDX2 regulates several essential processes in the development and function of the lower gastrointestinal tract (from the duodenum to the anus) in vertebrates. In vertebrate embryonic development, CDX2 becomes active in endodermal cells that are posterior to the developing stomach. These cells eventually form the intestinal epithelium. The activity of CDX2 at this stage is essential for the correct formation of the intestine and the anus. CDX2 is also required for the development of the placenta.

Later in development, CDX2 is expressed in intestinal epithelial stem cells, which are cells that continuously differentiate into the cells that form the intestinal lining. This differentiation is dependent on CDX2, as illustrated by experiments where the expression of this gene was knocked-out or overexpressed in mice. Heterozygous CDX2 knock-outs have intestinal lesions caused by the differentiation of intestinal cells into gastric epithelium; this can be considered a form of homeotic transformation. Conversely, the over-expression of CDX2 leads to the formation of intestinal epithelium in the stomach.

In addition to roles in endoderm, CDX2 is also expressed in very early stages of mouse and human embryonic development, specifically marking the trophectoderm lineage of cells in the blastocyst of mouse and human. Trophectoderm cells contribute to the placenta.

Pathology 
Ectopic expression of CDX2 was reported in more than 85% of the human patients with acute myeloid leukemia (AML). Ectopic expression of Cdx2 in murine bone marrow induced AML in mice and upregulate Hox genes in bone marrow progenitors. CDX2 is also implicated in the pathogenesis of Barrett's esophagus where it has been shown that components from gastroesophageal reflux such as bile acids are able to induce the expression of an intestinal differentiation program through up-regulation of NF-κB and CDX2.

Biomarker for intestinal cancer
CDX2 is also used in diagnostic surgical pathology as a marker for gastrointestinal differentiation, especially colorectal.

Possible use in stem cell research

This gene (or, more specifically, the equivalent gene in humans) has come up in the proposal by the President's Council on Bioethics, as a solution to the stem cell controversy. According to one of the plans put forth, by deactivating the gene, it would not be possible for a properly organized embryo to form, thus providing stem cells without requiring the destruction of an embryo. Other genes that have been proposed for this purpose include Hnf4, which is required for gastrulation.

Interactions 

CDX2 has been shown to interact with EP300, and PAX6.

References

Further reading

External links 
 
 

Transcription factors